Kentucky Route 74 (KY 74) is a 16.753-mile state highway in Bell County, Kentucky that runs from Tennessee State Route 90 at the Kentucky-Tennessee border in the town of Pruden to U.S. Route 25E in Middlesboro.

Major intersections

References

0074
Transportation in Bell County, Kentucky